Toronto Atomic FC is a Canadian soccer club founded in 2013. The team is currently operating an indoor team in the Arena Premier League under the name Ukraine AC. Toronto also fields several youth teams in CAF - Canadian Academy of Futbol. While Ukraine AC play their home matches at Canlan Sportsplex in Mississauga, Ontario.

History 
Atomic Selects Toronto FC was formed in 2013 as a soccer academy by HVAC contractor Ihor Prokipchuk. On February 10, 2015 Toronto Atomic joined the professional ranks as an expansion franchise in the Canadian Soccer League. The club received territorial rights in Etobicoke a district of Toronto and Centennial Park Stadium would serve as their home venue. Toronto Atomic secured the services of Ihor Yavorskyi as head coach with previous experience in the Ukrainian Premier League. Yavorskyi was able to acquire players who played in the Ukrainian top tier like Vasyl Shpuk, Ihor Ilkiv, Ihor Melnyk, Igor Migalevskyy, Andriy Dankiv, Mykhaylo Basarab, Oleksandr Semenyuk, Volodymyr Plishka, Denys Rylsky, Oleksandr Tomakh, and Stanislav Katana. The club made its CSL debut on May 9, 2015 in a 3-0 victory over Niagara United with Migalevskyy, Melnyk, and Mykola Voytsekhovskyy contributing the goals. Midway through the season Yavorskyi was dismissed from his post with Vasyl Ishchak being named his successor.

Ishchak managed to secure a postseason for the organization by finishing fifth in the overall standings. Their opponents in the quarterfinals were SC Waterloo, but lost the match by a score of 2-0. At the conclusion of the season Toronto received two league awards one for Ihor Melnyk as CSL Rookie of the Year, and Ishchak for CSL Coach of the Year. In preparations for the 2016 season Atomic extended Ischak contract, and named Michael Tischer team captain. Serhiy Konyushenko was appointed the head coach for the reserve team in the CSL Second Division. Toronto Atomic entered a team in the newly formed CAF LIKA Supergroup open division.

Toronto brought in further imports from the Ukraine signing Ivan Sozansky, Ostap Talochka, Roman Sakhno, Bohdan Polyakhov, and Canadian international Terry Dunfield. For the second straight season Toronto secured a postseason berth by finishing fifth in the standings. In the preliminary round of the playoffs Atomic were eliminated from the competition after a 1-0 loss to the Serbian White Eagles. In the Second Division the reserve team finished second in the regular season, and reached the CSL D2 Championship final where they faced the York Region Shooters B, but suffered a 2-1 defeat.

In 2017, Toronto Atomic discontinued the use of their senior team in the CSL, but continued fielding a team in the CAF LIKA Supergroup Open Division.

In 2017, Toronto Atomic began fielding an indoor team, and became a founding member in the Arena Premier League as Ukraine AC.

Roster

Head coaches

Year-by-year

References

External links  
Toronto Atomic FC website

 
Soccer clubs in Toronto
Canadian Soccer League (1998–present) teams
Ukrainian association football clubs outside Ukraine
Ukrainian diaspora in Canada
Association football clubs established in 2013
2013 establishments in Ontario
Soccer clubs in Ontario